Ivana Ferreira Fuso (born 12 March 2001) is a Brazilian professional footballer who plays as a forward for Bayer Leverkusen of the Frauen-Bundesliga, on loan from English Women's Super League club Manchester United, and the Brazil national team. Born in Salvador, Bahia, and raised in Germany, she played for her adoptive nation at youth international level, and earned caps for the under-15s, under-16s, under-17s and under-19s.

Club career

SC Freiburg
Fuso moved from SV Böblingen to the youth academy of SC Freiburg in the summer of 2016. Initially, Fuso was part of the under-17 squad and competed in the B-Junior Bundesliga South, scoring 16 goals in 17 appearances. From the 2017–18 season, Fuso was elevated to SC Freiburg II in the 2. Bundesliga. She made her SC Freiburg II debut on 24 September 2017 in a 0–0 draw against VfL Sindelfingen. She scored her first goal for the team in a 1–1 draw against 1. FC Köln II. On 31 March 2018, Fuso made her SC Freiburg first-team debut as a 71st-minute substitute for Klara Bühl in a 3–0 away win against Werder Bremen.

FC Basel
On 30 June 2019, Fuso moved to Swiss Nationalliga A team FC Basel.

Manchester United
On 14 July 2020, Fuso signed a two-year contract with an option for a third with English FA WSL club Manchester United. After suffering two separate muscle and ligament tears at the beginning of the season, Fuso was named in a matchday squad for the first time on 19 November 2020 but was an unused substitute during the 0–0 League Cup draw with Manchester City. She made her debut on 16 December 2020 as a 76th-minute substitute in a 1–0 defeat to Everton in the same competition. Her first season with the club was ended in March after picking up an ankle injury having made six appearances in all competitions, all as a substitute.

Bayer Leverkusen loan
On 7 July 2022, it was announced Fuso had signed a contract extension at Manchester United until June 2024 and loaned out to Bayer Leverkusen of the German Frauen-Bundesliga for the duration of the 2022–23 season.

International career

Youth
Fuso has represented Germany at youth level from under-15 up to under-19. She made her national team debut on 28 October 2014 for the under-15 national team in a 13–0 victory over Scotland as a 13-year-old. She scored her first goal on 4 June 2015 for the under-15 team in a 7–0 win against Czech Republic.

In 2018, Fuso was part of the under-17 squads for both the 2018 UEFA Women's Under-17 Championship and 2018 FIFA U-17 Women's World Cup. She captained the side and scored two goals at the Euros as Germany finished runners-up, losing in the final to Spain. The team finished top of their group at the World Cup but was eliminated by Canada at the quarter-final stage.

Fuso appeared twice during 2019 UEFA Women's Under-19 Championship qualification, scoring in an elite round win over Greece in April 2019, but was not selected for the tournament squad in July. She returned to the squad for 2020 UEFA Women's Under-19 Championship qualification, scoring three goals in three appearances during the first qualifying round.

Senior
In January 2021, Fuso was called up to the senior Brazil national team for the 2021 SheBelieves Cup. She made her debut on 18 February in the opening game of the tournament as a 67th-minute substitute for Chú Santos in a 4–1 win over Argentina. In November 2021, Fuso was called up for the 2021 Torneio Internacional de Futebol Feminino, making two substitute appearances against Venezuela and Chile as Brazil won the tournament.

Personal life
On 8 July 2021, Fuso married fellow Brazilian-German Rodrigo Ferreira, a footballer in the Landesliga, during a small ceremony in Sindelfingen after a three-year relationship. Ahead of the 2021–22 season, she announced she would be playing under her married surname, Ferreira Fuso.

Career statistics

Club
.

International summary

Honours
SC Freiburg
DFB-Pokal runner-up: 2019
Germany
UEFA Women's Under-17 Championship runner-up: 2018

Brazil
Torneio Internacional de Futebol Feminino: 2021

References

External links
 Profile at the Manchester United F.C. website
 

2001 births
Living people
Sportspeople from Salvador, Bahia
Brazilian women's footballers
Women's association football forwards
FC Basel Frauen players
Manchester United W.F.C. players
Swiss Women's Super League players
Women's Super League players
Brazil women's international footballers
Brazilian expatriate women's footballers
Brazilian expatriate sportspeople in Switzerland
Expatriate women's footballers in Switzerland
Brazilian expatriate sportspeople in England
Expatriate women's footballers in England
Brazilian emigrants to Germany
Naturalized citizens of Germany
German women's footballers
SC Freiburg (women) players
Frauen-Bundesliga players
Germany women's youth international footballers
German people of Brazilian descent
Sportspeople of Brazilian descent
21st-century Brazilian women
Germany international footballers
Expatriate footballers in Switzerland
Brazilian expatriate footballers
Brazil international footballers
Brazilian footballers
Association football forwards